New South Wales Food Authority (NSW Food Authority) is a statutory authority of Government of New South Wales, responsible for food safety and food labelling regulations in the state as well as consumer food safety promotion. It is part of the DPI Biosecurity and Food Safety Branch within the Department for Primary Industries, which is a part of the Department of Regional NSW.

The authority was established in April 2004 with the amalgamation of SafeFood Production NSW and the food inspection activities of the Department of Health (being the former Food Branch and the food inspection staff of the Area Health Services). SafeFood Production NSW was itself the product of a series of amalgamations of industry-specific organisations.  NSW is the first Australian state to consolidate such a wide range of food safety and food labelling functions into a single, central government agency.

Remit
The authority enforces the Food Act 2003 (NSW) and associated regulations within New South Wales in respect of all food for sale.  The act brings the bi-national Food Standards Code maintained by Food Standards Australia New Zealand into force within the state. The authority designs and monitors food safety schemes under the Food Regulation 2015 for higher risk industry sectors in the state, licenses food businesses under those schemes, receives notifications for non-retail food businesses, investigates food hygiene and labelling complaints for businesses it monitors, coordinates recalls of food products by companies in the state, coordinates the state's input to national food standards policy and implementation, and advises the NSW Minister for Primary Industries on food standards.

Completing the end-to-end remit of the agency, the Food Act also gives the authority a legislative responsibility 'to provide advice, information, community education and assistance in relation to matters connected with food safety or other interests of consumers in food'.

Scope of activities
The authority is Australia's first completely integrated or 'through-chain' state food regulation agency, responsible for food safety and food labelling across the food industry, from point of harvest or manufacture through processing, transport, storage and wholesale to point-of-sale and, arguably, point of consumption (see Remit, below). Both policy and enforcement activities are evidence-led.

Before the authority was established, responsibility for food regulation in NSW was divided across a number of state agencies, some with scope limited to specific food sectors such as meat, dairy or seafood or to horizontal parts of the food chain such as retail outlets. Various degrees of segmentation remain in other Australian State and territory jurisdictions. Evolution in the food, transport and trade industries was creating greater complexity in market structures, business reach and government regulation. The establishment of the authority was designed to create a more streamlined, consistent and efficient approach to food regulation in NSW and a single point of contact for both the food industry and public.

Some overlap of government agency remits regulating the sale of food remain, however, with NSW Fair Trading empowered to enforce the Fair Trading Act 1987 (NSW) and, at the federal level, the Australian Competition and Consumer Commission enforcing the Trade Practices Act 1974 (Cwlth) and National Measurement Institute, Australia enforcing the Trade Measurement Act 1989 (NSW). Furthermore, local government is also empowered to enforce food standards under the Food Act, mostly at the level of retail food outlets. The authority works with local councils to minimise overlap and duplication at the retail level and enhance consistency of enforcement activities and skills across the state. In July 2008, amendments to the Food Act formalised and mandated the (previously optional) food safety enforcement functions of local government. The amendments enabled the authority to appoint, after consultation, each local council to one of three predefined categories setting out each's food safety enforcement powers and responsibilities.

Scores on Doors program
The Scores on Doors program publishes the hygiene and food safety inspection result achieved by NSW retail food premises. The program  rates participating food business’ point-in-time compliance with NSW food safety legislation at time of unannounced inspection by government officers with an emphasis on the food handling practices linked to foodborne illness. When displayed prominently consumers can use this score to help them decide where to eat or buy food. The score can also be published on websites. Scores on Doors has equivalent programs in other jurisdictions  designed to reward well-performing businesses, drive food safety culture and ultimately reduce foodborne illness. The NSW program is open to retail food businesses which process and sell food in NSW that is: ready-to-eat, potentially hazardous (i.e. requires temperature control), and for immediate consumption. Examples include restaurants, take away shops, pub bistros, hotels, cafes, bakeries and clubs.  Scores are either Good (3 stars), Very Good (4 stars) or Excellent (5 stars); premises found with critical lapses in food safety standards or currently listed on the Name and Shame registers of on-the-spot fines or court fines are not awarded any display certificate.

The program was piloted in 2010, expanded to a trial in participating local government areas in 2011, and in late 2013 was enhanced to encourage further take-up.  Participation in the NSW program is voluntary and currently expanding across local governments across the State.

Name and shame initiative
In July 2008 the NSW government passed laws amending existing provisions which allowed the authority to publish details of successful food business prosecutions on its website . The new laws added, for the first time in Australia, provisions allowing for publication of details of penalty notices—akin to 'on-the-spot' fines—issued by enforcement staff for alleged breaches of food safety standards. Known colloquially as 'naming and shaming' food outlets, the initiative was a response to growing public demand for access to food business performance information, freedom of information advocates and the media.

See also 
 Food safety
 Foodborne illness
 Food allergy
 Hazard Analysis and Critical Control Points (HACCP), risk management methodology

References

External links
NSW Food Authority website
Scores on Doors program
Name and shame lists, NSW
Food Act 2003 (NSW) on www.legislation.nsw.gov.au
Food Standards Code on FSANZ website

2004 establishments in Australia
Government agencies established in 2004
Food safety organizations
Medical and health organisations based in New South Wales
Food Authority
Regulatory authorities of Australia